Peter Edward Bradley DL FRSA (born 26 June 1964) is an Anglican priest who served as Dean of Sheffield, 2003–2020.

Early life
Bradley was born on 26 June 1964. He was educated at the Royal Belfast Academical Institution, an all-boys grammar school in Belfast, Northern Ireland. He then studied at Trinity Hall, Cambridge.

Ordained ministry
Bradley was ordained in the Church of England as a deacon in 1988 and as a priest in 1989. He became the Chaplain of Gonville and Caius College, Cambridge.

He was Team Vicar of St Michael and All Angels, Abingdon and All Saints’, High Wycombe before his appointment as Dean of Sheffield. He was installed at Sheffield Cathedral on 4 October 2003; on 4 October 2020, Bradley announced his resignation from the Deanery with effect from 31 December 2020.

Interviews 
Three-part interview conducted by Henk de Berg (2018)

-- Part I (on the existence of God)

-- Part II (on gay marriage and women priests)

-- Part III (on faith, violence and terrorism)

References

	

1964 births
People educated at the Royal Belfast Academical Institution
Alumni of Trinity Hall, Cambridge
20th-century English Anglican priests
21st-century English Anglican priests
Provosts and Deans of Sheffield
Deputy Lieutenants of South Yorkshire
Living people